A Lego minifigure, commonly referred to as a minifig, is a small plastic articulated figurine produced by Danish toy manufacturer The Lego Group. They were first produced in 1978 and have been a success, with over 4 billion produced worldwide as of 2020. Minifigures are usually found within Lego sets, although they are also sold separately as collectables in blind bags, or custom-built in Lego stores. While some are named as specific characters, either licensed from film, television, and game franchises, or of Lego's own creation, many are unnamed and are designed simply to fit within a certain theme (such as police officers, astronauts and pirates). Minifigures are collected by both children and adults. They are highly customizable, and parts from different figures can be mixed and matched, resulting in many combinations.

Similar figures are produced by other companies, such as the Kreons from the construction toy Kre-O by the Korean company Oxford (subsidiary of Hasbro), or the figures by Block Tech or the Canadian company Mega Bloks.

There are also other types of figures from Lego sets, such as Duplo figures and mini-doll figures.

History 

A precursor to the minifigure was released in 1975. These were at the same scale as the current minifigures, but had a different design. They had solid torsos without separate movable arms, solid lower body pieces that were not moveable, and heads without printed features. They had a small variety of headpieces in various colors, including caps, pigtail hair and cowboy hats.

The first modern minifigures were released in 1978, included in Castle, Space, and Town sets. These were designed by Jens Nygaard Knudsen, who had come up with the idea for having the torsos, legs, and arm pieces interchangeable. As these were made into pieces, the company decided to give them a simple facial expression, rendered as two solid black dots for eyes and a smile painted in solid black, and without any gender or racial components, believing that these factors would be "determined by the child’s imagination and play".

In 1989 for the launch of Lego Pirates theme, minifigures also included hooks for hands, as well as peg legs; this was the first departure from the traditional body parts. Starting with Lego Pirates in 1989 and spreading to Lego Town and Lego Castle in the next few years, minifigures were also produced with different facial expressions such as facial hair, eye patches, feminine makeup, and sunglasses. Most of these early facial additions were still centered around the two eyes and smile, however starting in 1997 with Willa the Witch of the Fright Knights facial expressions became more complex including open mouths and detailed eyes.

Another departure from traditional parts was the use of spring-loaded legs. These legs are joined at the top. These legs were only featured in basketball sets, 2002–2003. Other leg variations include short legs for children or dwarfs, or long legs (used in the Toy Story and Avatar themes).

In 2003, the first minifigures with naturalistic skin tones (as opposed to the yellow used until this point) were released, as part of the Lego Basketball theme; these minifigures were also created in the likeness of living people. This also included Lando Calrissian in the Star Wars theme. The following year, the use of natural skin tones was expanded to all licensed products; in which figures were created to represent film actors and other living people. Popular examples include Star Wars, Indiana Jones, Harry Potter and Batman minifigures.

By 2006, Lego had reportedly produced 4 billion minifigures. There are at least 3655 different minifigures produced between 1975 and 2010 and the number of new minifigures per year is increasing rapidly. In 2010 more than 300 new minifigures were introduced.

Design and construction
Minifigures generally feature six parts (widely referred to as tools in the toy industry): head, torso, hips, arms, hands, and legs; these six parts allow seven points of articulation: swivel head, swivel arms, swivel wrists, and swivel legs. Minifigures are usually packaged as three separate parts in Lego sets: head, torso and legs. The plastic is acrylonitrile butadiene styrene (ABS), a tough material that makes LEGO figures durable.

The plastic is melted into specially designed molds that produce the different parts of the minifigure. Some of the molds are also accessories such as weapons (swords, guns, lightsabers, etc.) or everyday accessories (cups, food, tools, etc.). Heads and torsos nearly always need further decoration, and sometimes the arms and legs as well. This difficult process is why the figures are more expensive than any other Lego products. After being printed, the head is placed on the torso, the legs attached, and the arms are snapped on. The figures are finally bagged and readied for sale.

Use
Minifigure heads are cylindrical, and attach to a long, narrow cylinder molded onto the top of the torso, which allows the head to rotate. This feature also allows items to be attached to the figures over the torso, such as air tanks, capes or breastplates. The heads have a stud on top which is the same size as studs on standard Lego bricks which could allow one to be placed on it. The head is the only component of the minifigure which can be used for other applications - blank minifigure heads have often been used in Lego sets to replicate other objects such as lampshades and electrical appliances.

Head accessories vary widely, and include hair, helmets and hats. The legs rotate independently to 90 degrees forward, and nearly 45 degrees backward. Minifigures also connect to standard Lego bricks in both a sitting or standing position. The hands of a minifigure resemble the letter C, which allows them to hold many Lego accessories as well as bricks, tiles, and plates. There are hundreds of different accessories, including swords, axes, wands, cups, guns, and lightsabers. Additionally, the tops of the hands are approximately the same size as the studs on standard Lego bricks, which allows Lego pieces to be placed on top of them. These variations allow minifigures to be customized, keeping with the modular design of Lego elements.

Design variations 
 
While nearly all minifigure heads, torsos, arms, hands and legs are the same size and shape, some sets have included figures that deviate from the standard. One of the most extreme design variations was a minifigure produced in an edition of five of the Star Wars character C-3PO, cast in solid 14-karat gold.

Torso
Minifigures built from special, uniquely molded pieces were first introduced in Life on Mars. Martians are composed of five tools: two pairs of double arms, a mechanical torso, a conjoined leg piece, and a head. This configuration is also used for many Star Wars droids; Battle Droids follow the same pattern, while Super Battle Droids feature a head fixed to a torso, General Grievous has space for four arms, and IG-88 has a head constructed of other Lego pieces. Other droids, such as Droidekas, Spider Droids and Pit Droids, are constructed entirely from standard Lego pieces, yet are still generally considered minifigures. R2-D2 and other astromech droids are constructed from unique parts, with a separate top, body and legs. The robots of Exo-Force, Mars Mission commander aliens and Bionicle miniatures have a design similar to the Star Wars Battle Droids, but with separate legs, movable hands, and a head affixed to a small torso. Hagrid, the half-giant character from the Harry Potter series, uses a larger minifigure body, with only the head being separable.

Skeletons, usually found in Castle, Pirate, and Indiana Jones sets, use the standard minifigure head, but unique torsos, arms, and legs designed to resemble a skeletal structure; although different, these figure parts are still detachable. Skeleton figures and others alike stir up controversy on whether they should be considered a minifigure or just a "figure", due to the lack of standard minifigure parts.

Additionally, some minifigures, mostly pirates, sometimes include peg legs and hooks for hands.

Lego torsos often have black squares on the neck, this is to help with the automatic printing process when producing minifigures.

Head
Minifigures have also featured unique head sculpts that differ from the traditional cylindrical shape; the first was Jar Jar Binks, included in a Star Wars set in 1999, followed by Yoda, C-3PO, Harry Potter goblin figures, Kit Fisto, and Plo Koon. Kit Fisto was the first minifigure to not use an acrylonitrile butadiene styrene head. The minifigure used rubber instead. Traditional accessories, such as hats and helmets, cannot be placed on these non-standard heads. Some minifigures, such as Wookiees, Gamorrean Guards and Ewoks use a sandwich board piece which fits over the body. SpongeBob has a sculpted Lego brick head that fits like a standard head, similar to the ghost figures, except that these figures use short or standard legs instead of a brick.

Head and neck-wear
An enormous variety of clothing and accessories has been produced for minifigures, including hairstyles, caps, hats, and helmets. In Lego Star Wars sets, Clone Troopers and Stormtroopers have uniquely sculpted helmets, adapting the original character designs to the minifigure format. Exo-Force minifigures feature anime-style hair, as does the Nightwing minifigure from the Batman Arkham Asylum set.

Ghost figures have a full-body cape which attaches to the head of the minifigure, and solid brick-like legs.

Legs
Some minifigures, particularly in Castle and Pirate sets, use large sloped bricks instead of legs, to resemble dresses or skirts. However, these sloped bricks are taller than standard minifigure legs. In 2018, a special skirt piece was released, shorter, more softly curved on the back, and with regular leg pins to connect to the torso, instead of the studs on ordinary bricks.

In The Simpsons theme as well as other themes, a skirt fabric has been created allowing the minifigure to wear skirts. However, the first skirt mold appeared for the Minnie Mouse and Alice minifigures within the Disney Collectible minifigures theme. The mold for the Ballerina's skirt does predate the Disney minifigures by several months, but it resembles a straight up oval plate and considered a tutu.

Shorter legs, without joints at the hip, are sometimes used to create minifigures which are shorter in stature than standard figures (i.e. children, a leprechaun, Yoda or The Penguin). Such pieces were first created for Star Wars sets but have since been used elsewhere. In 2018, a medium-sized pair of legs was introduced, sized between the shorter legs and regular legs. These legs had a joint at the hip to allow individual movement of the legs, and were used to represent older tweens or younger teenagers, introduced for the rebooted Harry Potter theme.

Other legs include Genie smoke legs, mermaid tail legs, snake tail legs and octopus legs.

Customisation 
Minifig customisation is the practice of modifying Lego minifigures. This can be as simple as mixing and matching parts, or as complex as painting or remolding plastic. Some custom minifigures are made by affixing stickers or decals to the figures. There are also third party businesses which sell custom decals and molded minifigure accessories, many of which are inspired by popular media such as films and video games. While a relatively recent phenomenon, minifigure customisation has rapidly become popular within the wider building community, although some maintain a "purist" approach, using only elements produced by Lego.

Lego executives have for some years now been using personalised minifigures in place of business cards, with email and phone details on the front and back of the torso, and hair and facial features designed to resemble each executive. You can see a list of 39 of these here at 39 Lego Employee Business Cards. It is believed that over 100 of these exist.

Collecting 
Both children and adult fans of Lego (AFOL) collect Lego Minifigures without collecting the sets. The Lego group has produced more than 1,000,000,000 Minifigures in the past 30 years  and many people buy and sell these on eBay and other sites such as Bricklink.  Some of the most expensive and rare minifigures can be viewed at Rare and Expensive Lego Minifigures.

Collectible Minifigures (CMF)

The Collectible Minifigures (CMF) theme, introduced in 2010, is a set of individually packaged "blind bag" minifigures. Each series consists of approximately 16 new and exclusive minifigures, with a random assortment of 60 polybags per box. A new series is released every three to four months, with some having a theme (e.g. monsters or masquerade) and others including a wide variety of minifigs. Several blogs publish "feel guides" to help collectors figure out which minifigures are inside the opaque package. The minifigures can be based on movies, sports, fiction, history, or jobs/hobbies (i.e. Punk Rocker, Dino Tracker, Caveman). All CMF minifigures come with a Lego "stand". Most CMF come with an (often unique) accessory and many have uniquely printed body parts.

Variations

Light up light-sabers
Other variations of the standard minifigure produced for Star Wars sets included the light-up light-saber (L.U.L.S.) minifigures. These figures were released as a part of the more expensive Star Wars Episode III sets in 2005. These figures look like standard minifigures, but to facilitate internal electronics, their parts cannot be removed; the only exception to this is the headgear, the left hand and arm, and each of the legs from the hips. When the head is pressed down, an LED illuminates the light-saber blade. These figures rely on battery power for their special feature. The batteries last three hours and are not intended to be replaced, although replacement is possible.

Many fans, especially children, were amenable to this innovation. Others however, particularly adult collectors, found these figures contentious, considering them to be an unwelcome gimmick. The fact that in two cases unique characters were produced solely as L.U.L. minifigs, with no standard version available to collectors, was also an unpopular decision. Following the initial release of these figures Lego announced no more were to be produced, due to their unpopularity and more expensive production. One set, the 7261 Clone Turbo Tank, which featured an L.U.L. version of Jedi Knight Mace Windu, was even reissued with a standard version of the minifig and an extra Clone Trooper figure to make up the cost of the set.

There was also at least one high end City themed set (a Police Station/HQ) that included a police officer with a light up 'torch'. Another L.U.L.S. minfig in police uniform appeared without the 'saber' part of the light saber and a yellow LED in the 'handle' of the light saber, reusing the L.U.L.S. design outside the Star-wars setting as an effective 'torch'. He appeared in a high end City set based on a standard and well selling City Police HQ design. A complaint about the set was that the L.U.L.S. minifig was contained in a 'try me' compartment of the box allowing customers (and excited children) to wear down his battery while he was still on the shelf. The set was discontinued after a year with a separate identical design but with 3 extra normal minifgs replacing the L.U.L.S. minfig.

Magnets
Yet another variation on the minifigure is the magnet figure, from such themes as Star Wars, Batman, Indiana Jones, and City. The magnet figures are not included in regular sets but are instead sold in packs of three or more. Some of these include accessories and display base bricks. These figures include magnets in their legs, which allow them to stick to metal surfaces. Magnet figures are nearly indistinguishable from standard figures in appearance. Unlike the LUL figures, only the torso and the hips of magnet minifigures are inseparable.

Bigfigures
Bigfigures are Lego figurines that are taller and more muscular then regular minifigures which were introduced in 2008. Though most share the same body shape and pose, There are a few different variations, such as the Rancor from Star Wars which is at an even bigger size. Some bigfigs have removable heads.

A precursor to the bigfigure was released in 1999 under the Rock Raiders theme.

Microfigures
Within the Lego Games theme, the Lego microfigures were released. For that name, they are about half the size of the regular Lego minifigure. The microfigures have a fixed head, small, non-movable legs which somewhat resemble normal minifigure legs, and a hint of shoulders for arms.  The microfigures have found their way into commercially available sets such as 10253 Big Ben.

Nanofigures
Lego Nanofigures are miniature versions of original minifigures, following the same general shape, but without any moving parts, roughly the same height as a regular minifigure's legs. From 2010, they were initially produced in metal colors to represent trophies and statuettes, but from 2011 onwards they got printing to represent characters in sets produced in micro-scale, too small for regular minifigures, or to represent diminutive characters such as Ant-Man.

Baby minifigure
In 2016, a new mold for a minifigure-style human baby was introduced. Although similar to a microfigure in body shape, it has a detachable head and actual molded arms (albeit, non-posable). It has mainly made appearances in LEGO City sets, such as the Lego City Fun at the Park set. It was also notable for appearing as an accessory for the Babysitter in the 16th series of Lego Minifigures, and LEGO 10255 Assembly Square, which is the 2017 Lego Modular Building. In LEGO The Mandalorian sets, the Grogu minifigure uses this body mold.

Other Lego figures 
In some Lego products, figures other than standard minifigures are used. A catalog that shows all these Lego figures is available. Some Lego sets from 1974 on included much larger figures where only the heads and hair were special pieces , which is why the usual figures are "mini". Technic used larger scale action figures between 1986 and 2001. These figures featured more realistic sculpts, although still distinctively angular, and featured more articulation, including bendable elbows and knees. These figures are further distinguished from minifigures in that they cannot be easily disassembled; even the hair pieces are non-removable. Duplo includes figures that have less articulation than standard minifigures and cannot be disassembled for safety reasons. Likewise, the Fabuland collection, produced in the 1980s, consisted of larger anthropomorphized animal characters, which also could not be easily disassembled. Belville and Scala, Lego products marketed to girls, also include larger scale figures. These figures are similar to Technic figures in articulation, but feature less angular body sculpts. Scala figures more closely resemble dolls, in that clothes are separate from the figures and hair is made of strands rather than molded plastic. The Lego Baby line included figures that could move at all and had the size a bit bigger than the Duplo figures. In 2001 Lego further expanded the minifigure system, with the introduction of Bionicle figures. These figures are a part of a fictional story developed by Lego and resemble biomechanical creatures. Initially, these figures were produced without articulation, only able to hold tools and weapons. Bionicle later got replaced with Hero Factory in 2010. In 2005, Lego released Bionicle playsets, with minifigure variations of characters that had previously been produced in the larger Bionicle scale, notably the Toa and Visorak characters. While these minifigures did not feature movable parts, Lego released Piraka and Inika playsets in 2006, which included minifigures with movable parts. The Friends theme, released in 2012, included mini-doll figures, a more doll-like construction with more realistic anatomy, soon introduced into other themes chiefly aimed at girls. Even though the mini-dolls in the Lego Friends theme have more realistic anatomy, the mini-dolls' legs can only move ninety degrees into a sitting position. The mini-dolls' legs are also molded together and can not move separately as the traditional Lego minifigure legs can. The mini-doll in the Lego Friends theme is slightly taller than the traditional minifigure.

Depiction in other media
 
 Minifigures have appeared in a variety of short films. Examples include the Spellbreaker animated adventure featured in Legoland parks, produced by the Billund-based animation studio Lani Pixels, and the Lego-sanctioned spoof of Star Wars titled Revenge of the Brick, produced by Treehouse Animation. These short film features computer-animated minifigures with added articulation and mobility, as well as textural modifications to create a realistic effect. Promotional videos on the Lego Batman official site are presented in a similar format and are also produced by Treehouse Animation.  The 2010 computer generated animation Lego: The Adventures of Clutch Powers became the first feature-length original Lego film; it has minifigures as the protagonists.
 In 2011, Lego minifigures were featured in Toy Story 3 and the Toy Story short "Hawaiian Vacation".
 Lego has furthered the development of minifigures in entertainment media. In Lego video games, such as Lego Star Wars and Lego Racers, playable characters are animated minifigures, which feature more articulation and mobility than real minifigures, but retain the same basic appearance. Most Lego computer and video games have similarly animated minifigures, though depicted with varying degrees of realism.
 In January 2012, a Lego minifigure carrying a Canadian flag was sent up to the stratosphere and garnered worldwide attention.
 NASA's Juno spacecraft which entered orbit around the planet Jupiter in 2016 carries three specially commissioned minifigures on board. Cast from space-grade aluminum, the minifigures represent the astronomer Galileo, the Roman deity Jupiter and his wife Juno.
 The Lego Movie and its sequel, The Lego Movie 2: The Second Part, feature a vast population of minifigures living in a Lego universe setting. This extends to two spin-off movies: 
 The Lego Batman Movie features minifigures in the DC Comics Universe.
 The Lego Ninjago Movie features minifigures in the Lego Ninjago universe.

See also 

 Lego gun
 Lego tire
 Lego timeline

References

External links

 Official Lego Website
 LEGO Star Wars minifigs

Minifigure
Products introduced in 1978
Action figures
Corporate mascots
Toy mascots